Nash (also Romanized as Nāsh) is a village in Khorgam Rural District, Khorgam District, Rudbar County, Gilan Province, Iran. At the 2006 census, its population was 414, in 130 families.

References 

Populated places in Rudbar County